Daphnella ornata is a species of sea snail, a marine gastropod mollusk in the family Raphitomidae.

Description
The length of the shell varies between 6 mm and 24 mm.

The shell is cancellated with decussating striae. The sinus is rather broad. The color of the shell is pale fulvous with two revolving rows of short flames or spots of chestnut.

Distribution
This marine species occurs from Japan to Hawaii, the Philippines, Paumotu Islands and off New Guinea and Queensland, Australia.

References

 Garrett, A. 1873. Descriptions of new species of marine shells inhabiting the South Sea Islands. Proceedings of the Academy of Natural Sciences, Philadelphia 1873: 209-231, pls 2-3
 Cernohorsky, W.O. 1978. Tropical Pacific marine shells. Sydney : Pacific Publications 352 pp., 68 pls. 
 Severns, M. (2011). Shells of the Hawaiian Islands - The Sea Shells. Conchbooks, Hackenheim. 564 pp.
 Liu J.Y. [Ruiyu] (ed.). (2008). Checklist of marine biota of China seas. China Science Press. 1267 pp.

External links
 Hinds R. B. (1844-1845). Mollusca. In: The zoology of the voyage of H. M. S. "Sulphur", under the command of Captain Sir Edward Belcher, R. N., C. B., F. R. G. S., etc., during the years 1836-42. London: Smith, Elder and Co. v + 72 pp., 21 pls
  Hedley, C. 1922. A revision of the Australian Turridae. Records of the Australian Museum 13(6): 213-359, pls 42-56 
 
  Kay, E. A. (1979). Hawaiian marine shells. Reef and shore fauna of Hawaii. Section 4: Mollusca. Bernice P. Bishop Museum Special Publications. 64xviii + 1-653
 Moretzsohn, Fabio, and E. Alison Kay. "HAWAIIAN MARINE MOLLUSCS." (1995)
 N. V. Subba Rao  "Indian Seashells—Polyplacophora and Gastropoda (1)"; Records of the Zoological Survey of India; Occasional Paper No. 192

ornata
Gastropods described in 1844